The 1996–97 League of Ireland First Division season was the 12th season of the League of Ireland First Division.

Overview
The First Division was contested by 10 teams and Kilkenny City won the division.

Final table

Promotion/relegation play-off
Third placed Waterford United played off against Dundalk F.C. who finished in tenth place in the 1996–97 League of Ireland Premier Division. The winner would compete in the 1997–98 League of Ireland Premier Division.

1st Leg

2nd Leg

Dundalk F.C. won 3–1 on aggregate and retained their place in the Premier Division.

See also
 1996–97 League of Ireland Premier Division

References

League of Ireland First Division seasons
2
Ireland